Robert Alan Stutz (born October 20, 1972) is the former Chief Legal Counsel to the Montana State Legislature.

Chief Legal Counsel 
Stutz served as the Chief Legal Counsel to the Montana legislature for the 2011 session. During this period he managed the Legal Services Office for the legislature, represented the legislature in litigation, provided legal opinions to legislators, and reviewed drafts of legislation.

References 

1972 births
Living people
Montana lawyers